Bernardino León de la Rocha (4 April 1620 – 4 January 1675) was a Roman Catholic prelate who served as Bishop of Coria (1673–1675) and Bishop of Tui (1669–1673).

Biography
Bernardino León de la Rocha was born in Badajoz, Spain on 4 April 1620 and ordained a priest on 13 March 1656.
On 17 March 1669, he was selected by the King of Spain and confirmed by Pope Clement IX on 15 July 1669 as Bishop of Tui. In 1669, he was consecrated bishop by Antonio Fernández del Campo Angulo y Velasco, Bishop of Coria, with Antonio Peña Hermosa, Bishop of Jaén, serving as co-consecrator.
On 25 September 1673, he was appointed during the papacy of Pope Clement X as Bishop of Coria.
He served as Bishop of Coria until his death on 4 January 1675.

References

External links and additional sources
 (for Chronology of Bishops) 
 (for Chronology of Bishops) 
 (for Chronology of Bishops) 
 (for Chronology of Bishops) 

17th-century Roman Catholic bishops in Spain
Bishops appointed by Pope Clement IX
Bishops appointed by Pope Clement X
1620 births
1675 deaths